Ptychoptera contaminata  is a species of fly in the family Ptychopteridae. It is found in the  Palearctic.

References

Ptychopteridae
Flies described in 1758
Nematoceran flies of Europe
Taxa named by Carl Linnaeus